Tal Michael Dunne (born 25 February 1987) is a Wales-born Israeli former basketball player for Ironi Nes Ziona of the Israeli Basketball Premier League.

Early life
Dunne was born in Aberystwyth, Wales, to a Jewish family. Dunne lived his first 3 years in the United Kingdom, before immigrating with his family to Israel to grow up in the city of Rishon LeZion. He played for Maccabi Rishon LeZion youth team and the Gymnasia Realit high school team.

Professional career

Early years (2005–2011)
In 2005, Dunne started his professional career with Maccabi Rishon LeZion. On October 23, 2005, he made his professional debut in a match against Maccabi Haifa.

In 2006, Dunne was loaned to Maccabi Ashdod of the Liga Leumit. In 17 games played for Ashdod, Dunne averaged 16.1 points and 3.6 rebounds per game.

On February 14, 2010, Dunne returned to Maccabi Ashdod for a second stint, signing for the rest of the season.

On August 31, 2010, Dunne signed with Hapoel Afula for the 2010–11 season.

Ironi Nes Ziona (2011–2022)
On October 20, 2011, Dunne returned to Ironi Nes Ziona for a second stint. In his second season with Nes Ziona, Dunne helped them to promote to the Israeli Basketball Premier League for the first time in their history. He was named Finals MVP. In 23 games played during the 2012–13 season, Dunne averaged 18.2 points, 6.3 rebounds and 3.7 assists per game.

On July 4, 2013, Dunne signed a two-year contract extension with Nes Ziona.

On November 24, 2014, Dunne recorded a career-high 29 points, shooting 12-of-19 from the field, along with six rebounds and six assists in an 87–83 win over Ironi Nahariya.

On June 22, 2016, Dunne signed a three-year contract extension with Nes Ziona. That season, Dunne helped Nes Ziona to promote to the Premier League after they swept Hapoel Be'er Sheva 3–0 in the best-of-five series.

In his seventh season with Nes Ziona, Dunne helped them to reach the 2018 Israeli League Playoffs, where they eventually lost to Maccabi Tel Aviv.

On December 15, 2018, Dunne recorded a season-high 20 points, shooting 9-of-14 from the field, along with eight rebounds, six assists and two steals, leading Nes Ziona to an 88–78 win over Hapoel Holon. He was subsequently named Israeli League Round 10 MVP. On January 1, 2019, Dunne was named Israeli League Player of the Month after averaging 14.3 points, 8.7 rebounds and 6.3 assists in three games played in December.

On July 1, 2019, Dunne signed a two-year contract extension with Nes Ziona.

Israel national team
Dunne was a member of the Israeli U-18 and U-20 national teams.

References

External links
RealGM profile
FIBA profile

1987 births
Living people
British Jews
British people of Israeli descent
Hapoel Afula players
Ironi Ashkelon players
Ironi Nes Ziona B.C. players
Israeli Basketball Premier League players
Israeli Jews
Israeli men's basketball players
Jewish men's basketball players
Maccabi Ashdod B.C. players
Maccabi Rishon LeZion basketball players
Power forwards (basketball)
Small forwards
Sportspeople from Aberystwyth
Welsh Jews
Welsh men's basketball players
Welsh people of Israeli descent